The following is a comprehensive discography of Apocalyptica, a Finnish cello metal group. As a band, they have released nine studio albums, that have charted in their native Finland, Austria, France, and in the United States. In addition to their nine studio albums, also released are two compilation albums, one soundtrack, one live album and three DVD albums.

Apocalyptica have released 13 singles to date, including two number ones. The first, "Bittersweet" reached No. 1 in Finland in 2004. Their single, "I Don't Care" featuring Adam Gontier on lead vocals, reached No. 1 in 2008 on the US Hot Mainstream Rock Tracks chart.

Albums

Studio albums

Live albums

Compilation albums

Extended plays

Singles

Notes
 A ^"Nothing Else Matters" was a promotional-only release.
 B ^"Not Strong Enough" single was first released with Brent Smith of Shinedown on vocals in Europe in November 2010. The second version of the single, re-recorded with a different singer, Doug Robb, due to Shinedown's label Atlantic not allowing Smith's vocals to be used on the US radio, was released in the US market in 2011.

Video albums

Music videos

Guest appearances

References

Heavy metal group discographies
Discographies of Finnish artists
Discography